Beryozovka is a rural locality (a selo) and the administrative center of Beryozovskoye Rural Settlement, Vorobyovsky District, Voronezh Oblast, Russia. The population was 376 as of 2010. There are 16 streets.

Geography 
Beryozovka is located 9 km northeast of Vorobyovka (the district's administrative centre) by road. Muzhichye is the nearest rural locality.

References 

Rural localities in Vorobyovsky District